Virginia Ty-Navarro (5 July 1924 – 1996) was a Filipina sculptor, known nationwide for her sculpture "Statue of Our Lady Queen of Peace", which she completed in sixteen months on a 12 million peso budget. The sculpture is alternatively called "Our Lady of EDSA Shrine" and is located in Ortigas.

Ty-Navarro was born on 5 July 1924. Ty-Navarro took a course in Fine Arts at the University of Santo Tomas where she studied under National Artist Carlos “Botong” Francisco and National Artist Victorio C. Edades during the Japanese occupation of the Philippines.
 
She worked on metal sculptures, such as bronze. She followed a modernist style in her art. Some of her works are displayed at the National Museum of Fine Arts.

Ty-Navarro was married to fellow artist Jerry Elizalde Navarro. She died from Alzheimer's disease in 1996.

Exhibits and works 
Women in Art 2008:Oil Painting and Metal Sculpture

References

External links 
Jerry Elizalde Navarro
"Nude Torso" and "Tantrum" metal sculptures
Women In Art (Philippines)

See also 
Jerry Elizalde Navarro 

1924 births
1996 deaths
Filipino sculptors
Filipino women artists
University of Santo Tomas alumni